The ARM Cortex-X3 is the third generation X-series high-performance CPU core from Arm.

Improvements 
 25% peak performance improvement over the Cortex-X2.
 11% IPC uplift over the Cortex-X2, when based on the same process, clock speed, and cache setup (also known as ISO-process).
 34% performance gain over a mid-tier Intel Core i7-1260P (Alder Lake).

Usage 

 MediaTek Dimensity 9200
 Qualcomm Snapdragon 8 Gen 2

References 

ARM processors